Arroz caldo is a Filipino rice and chicken gruel heavily infused with ginger and garnished with toasted garlic, scallions, and black pepper. It is usually served with calamansi or fish sauce (patis) as condiments, as well as a hard-boiled egg. Most versions also add safflower (kasubha) which turns the dish characteristically yellow. Arroz caldo is also known as pospas in Visayan regions, though pospas has slightly different ingredients.

Arroz caldo is a type of lugaw. It is regarded as a comfort food in Philippine culture and is a popular breakfast meal.

Etymology
The name is derived from Spanish arroz ("rice") and caldo ("broth"). It originally referred to all types of rice gruels (Tagalog: lugaw), but has come to refer to a specific type of lugaw that uses chicken and is heavily infused with ginger.

Although arroz caldo has a Spanish name it has its origins from the congee introduced by Chinese-Filipino migrants. It has diverged over the centuries to use Filipino ingredients and suit the local tastes.

Description

Arroz caldo typically uses glutinous rice (malagkit), but can also be made with regular rice boiled with an excess of water. The chicken pieces are usually cooked first in a broth with a large amount of ginger. The chicken are taken out and shredded once tender then re-added along with the rice. The rice is continually stirred while cooking to prevent it from sticking to the pot. The characteristic yellow color of the dish is due to the addition of kasubha (safflower). In more expensive versions, saffron may be used, which further enhances the flavor, unlike safflower. When neither are available, some versions use turmeric instead.

Arroz caldo is served in individual bowls with a single hard-boiled egg. It is garnished with toasted garlic, chopped scallions, and black pepper. Crumbled chicharon can also be added to augment the texture and taste. While arroz caldo is very fragrant, it is usually quite bland in taste and thus need to be seasoned further with various condiments. The most commonly used condiments are calamansi and fish sauce (patis). Lime or lemon may be substituted for calamansi.

Arroz caldo is regarded as a comfort food in Filipino cuisine. It is usually eaten for breakfast, during colder months, during rainy weather, and by people who are sick or bedridden. It is eaten hot or warm, since the dish congeals if left to cool. It can be reheated by adding a little bit of water.

Philippine Airlines is particularly known for its arroz caldo, reportedly a favorite of President Corazon Aquino.

Variants

In Visayan regions, savory lugaw is known as pospas. Chicken pospas is regarded as the direct equivalent of arroz caldo. However, unlike arroz caldo, pospas traditionally does not use safflower.

A much rarer variant of arroz caldo is arroz caldong palaka, which uses frog legs (palaka means "frog" in Tagalog). Non-traditional variants include vegan versions which use mushrooms or tofu instead of meat. 

Goto is closely related to arroz caldo but is regarded as a different type of lugaw since it does not rely heavily on ginger. It is prepared similarly as arroz caldo but uses beef tripe that has been soaked and boiled for hours until very tender. It is also known as arroz caldo con goto or arroz con goto, from Tagalog goto ("tripe").

See also
Bubur ayam
Ginataang mais

References

Rice dishes
Philippine rice dishes
Philippine chicken dishes
Garlic dishes
Ginger dishes
Porridges